Korbovo is a village in the municipality of Kladovo, Serbia. According to the 2002 census, the village has a population of 1067 people. Korbovo can be reached from Kladovo or from Rtkovo. Due to the economic crisis in Serbia, most of the inhabitants of Korbovo live abroad or in larger cities and return only for Holidays.

References

External links

Populated places in Bor District